Royalton is a village in Franklin County, Illinois, United States. The population was 1,151 at the 2010 census.

History
According to the original surveys of Illinois, in the early 19th century the Lusk's Ferry Road ran through the middle of what is now Royalton, heading on a diagonal line toward the southeast. The Lusk's Ferry Road was an important early road connecting Fort Kaskaskia with Lusk's Ferry on the Ohio River. No trace of this road remains near Royalton. It is not clear whether the road figured in the early history of the town, or if it was long forgotten before Royalton came into existence.

Royalton was established in 1907.

On October 22, 1914, an explosion in the North Mine of the Franklin Coal & Coke Company killed 51 miners. This was the worst mine disaster to date in the coal fields of southern Illinois.

Geography
Royalton is located in southwestern Franklin County at  (37.880196, -89.113509). Illinois Route 149 passes through the center of town, leading north and east  to Zeigler and west and south  to Hurst.

Demographics

As of the census of 2000, there were 1,130 people, 516 households, and 314 families residing in the village. The racial makeup of the village was 99.65% White, 0.09% Native American, and 0.27% from two or more races. Hispanic or Latino of any race were 0.27% of the population.

There were 516 households, out of which 26.9% had children under the age of 18 living with them, 45.0% were married couples living together, 12.4% had a female householder with no husband present, and 39.1% were non-families. 35.5% of all households were made up of individuals, and 19.6% had someone living alone who was 65 years of age or older.  The average household size was 2.19 and the average family size was 2.81.

In the village, the population was spread out, with 22.7% under the age of 18, 7.1% from 18 to 24, 24.2% from 25 to 44, 26.5% from 45 to 64, and 19.5% who were 65 years of age or older.  The median age was 41 years. For every 100 females, there were 88.3 males.  For every 100 females age 18 and over, there were 83.6 males.

The median income for a household in the village was $23,947, and the median income for a family was $29,886. Males had a median income of $28,542 versus $21,250 for females. The per capita income for the village was $15,778.  About 16.8% of families and 20.3% of the population were below the poverty line, including 21.2% of those under age 18 and 15.4% of those age 65 or over.

Notable church
Royalton is home to the only Russian Orthodox church in southern Illinois, The Protection of the Holy Virgin Mary Orthodox Church.  The church was founded by eastern European immigrants, including Rusyns, many of whom worked in local coal mines    The three principal founders were Frank Derbak, John August and Paul Andrews.  The church opened to parishioners in late 1914. 

At one time, there was a Russian Orthodox church in nearby Dowell, but it has closed. A memorial to the Dowell church is located in Royalton. 

On October 27, 1914 there was an explosion at the Royalton North No. 1 Mine, killing over 100 miners. Many of the miners who were killed in the disaster were members of the church.  There is a memorial at the church, and many of the miners were buried in a cemetery dedicated to the disaster.

References

External links

 
 Royalton History

Villages in Franklin County, Illinois
Villages in Illinois
Populated places established in 1907
Coal in Illinois
Populated places in Southern Illinois